The 2021–22 Croatian First Football League (officially Hrvatski Telekom Prva liga for sponsorship reasons) was the 31st season of the Croatian First Football League, the national championship for men's association football teams in Croatia, since its establishment in 1992. Contested by 10 teams, the season started on 16 July 2021 and ended on 21 May 2022. Dinamo Zagreb, the defending champions, successfully defended their title.

Teams
On 23 April 2021, Croatian Football Federation announced that the first stage of licensing procedure for 2020–21 season was complete. For the 2021–22 Prva HNL, eleven clubs were issued a top level license: Cibalia, Dinamo Zagreb, Gorica, Hajduk Split, Hrvatski Dragovoljac, Istra 1961, Lokomotiva, Osijek, Rijeka, Slaven Belupo and Varaždin. All of these clubs except Cibalia and Hrvatski Dragovoljac were also issued a license for participating in UEFA competitions.

The following teams will compete in the 2021–22 Prva HNL.

Changes
Hrvatski Dragovoljac (promoted after a seven-year absence) was promoted from the 2020–21 Druga HNL. Varaždin (relegated after two years in the top flight) was relegated to 2021–22 Druga HNL.

Stadia and locations

 1 Hrvatski Dragovoljac host their home matches at Stadion Kranjčevićeva. The stadium is originally the home ground of third-level side NK Zagreb.
 2 Lokomotiva host their home matches at Stadion Kranjčevićeva. The stadium is originally the home ground of third-level side NK Zagreb.

Personnel and kits

Managerial changes

League table

Results
Each team plays home-and-away against every other team in the league twice, for a total of 36 matches each played.

First round

Second round

Statistics

Top goalscorers

Awards

Annual awards

References

External links
Official website 
Prva HNL at UEFA.com

2021-22
2021–22 in Croatian football
2021–22 in European association football leagues